NCX can refer to:

 North Central Expressway, a section of the Central Expressway, Dallas
 Sodium-calcium exchanger, a transport protein
 ncx, the ISO 639-3 code for the Central Puebla Nahuatl dialect
 .ncx, a file extension